Rajya Sabha elections were held in 1994, to elect members of the Rajya Sabha, Indian Parliament's upper chamber. 3 seats from Delhi & 1 seat from Sikkim,  58 members from 12 states  and 3 members from Kerala State are elected.

Elections
Elections were held in 1994 to elect members from various states.
The list is incomplete.

Members elected
The following members are elected in the elections held in 1994. They are members for the term 1994-2000 and retire in year 2000, except in case of the resignation or death before the term.

State - Member - Party

Bye-elections
The following bye elections were held in the year 1994.

State - Member - Party

 AP -  T. Venkatram Reddy - INC  (  ele  31/01/1994 term till 1996 )
 UP - Sanjay Dalmia - SP  (  ele  03/02/1994 term till 1998 )

References

1994 elections in India
1994